Kanowit may refer to:
Kanowit, a town and the capital of a district of the same name, located within the Sibu Division, Sarawak, Malaysia
Kanowit (federal constituency), represented in the Dewan Rakyat
Kanowit language, also called Serau Tet Kanowit (language of the Kanowit people), is an Austronesian language spoken in Sarawak, Malaysia on the island of Borneo